Yanguna cometes is a species of skipper butterfly in the family Hesperiidae.

Description
The uppersides of the wings are metallic blue, with a reddish basal area and broad white bands crossing the forewings. The undersides are similar to the uppersides. The body is hairy and reddish, while the abdomen is black crossed by white stripes.

Distribution
This species occurs in Suriname, Peru and Bolivia.

Subspecies
Yanguna cometes cometes (Suriname)
Yanguna cometes cometides Mabille & Boullet, 1908 (Bolivia)
Yanguna cometes staudingeri (Plötz, 1879) (Peru, Bolivia)

References
 Funet

External links
Neotropical butterflies
Pteron World
Butterflies of America
Yanguna cometes

Hesperiidae
Butterflies described in 1779
Fauna of Suriname
Fauna of Peru
Fauna of Bolivia
Hesperiidae of South America
Taxa named by Pieter Cramer